Persefone is an Andorran progressive death metal band formed in October 2001. The band's name is derived from Persephone, a figure in Greek Mythology.

Overview 
Persefone was founded in early 2001 in Andorra la Vella, the capital of the small European nation of Andorra. The founding members are Carlos Lozano Quintanilla, Jordi Gorgues Mateu, Toni Mestre Coy, and Xavi Pérez. In 2002 they were joined by Miguel Espinosa Ortiz. A demo was recorded in 2003, and the concept of the album took shape: the five soul illnesses combined with the transition from life to death. A 6-track demo became an LP with the help of Claus Jensen and Intromental Management; Truth Inside the Shades was recorded at Orion Studios and mastered by Peter in de Betou for Taylor Maid Productions.

Some gigs were scheduled, but Pérez left the band, and was replaced by Aleix Dorca Josa, producer of the band, who joined it to perform drums. Also, Marc Marti became the lead singer, taking over for Quintanilla. After this, Truth Inside the Shades was released worldwide through Soundholic Records (Japan), Cd-Maximum (Russia and Baltic States), and Adipocere Records (Europe and United States). 

The next album, a longer concept album, relates the story of Persephone, the Greek goddess for which the band was named. In August 2006, Core was released in Japan through Soundholic Records. In 2007, a year after its Japanese release, Persefone signed a deal with Greek label Burning Star Records, and in August the album was released worldwide.

In 2010, the band released its new, Japanese-influenced album Shin-Ken and in March 2010 they supported Obituary in a tour.

Persefone's fourth record, Spiritual Migration, was released in 2013. On 5 August 2014, the band announced that drummer Marc Mas had left the band on good terms.

Persefone's next album, Aathma, was released in February 2017.

On 22 February 2018, Persefone announced that they would release a new single, "In Lak'Ech", a month later on 23 March, featuring Tim Charles from Ne Obliviscaris. The song title comes from "In Lak'ech Ala K'in", a traditional Mayan greeting, meaning "I am another yourself" or "I am you, and you are me".

Members 

Current
Toni Mestre Coy – bass (2001–present)
Carlos Lozano Quintanilla – guitar (2001–present), vocals (2001–2004)
Miguel Espinosa – keyboards, vocals (2002–present)
Marc Martins Pia – vocals (2004–present)
Sergi Verdeguer – drums (2015–present)
Filipe Baldaia – guitar (2016–present)

Former
Jordi Gorgues Mateu – guitar (2001–2016)
Xavi Perez – drums (2001–2003)
Aleix Dorca Josa – drums (2003–2006)
Marc Mas Marti – drums (2006–2014)

Timeline

Discography 
Truth Inside the Shades (2004, re-recorded in 2020)
Core (2006)
Shin-Ken (2009)
Spiritual Migration (2013)
Aathma (2017)
Metanoia (2022)

References

External links 
 
 

2001 establishments in Andorra
Andorran musical groups
Death metal musical groups
Musical groups established in 2001